The 1991 New Jersey State Senate elections were held on November 5.

The election took place mid-way through the term of Governor James Florio. The results were a landslide victory for the Republican Party amidst a tax revolt by New Jersey voters. Democrats picked up only one seat, that of Senator Lee B. Laskin. Republicans picked up eleven Democrat seats, winning control of the Senate for the first time since 1978.

Background

Redistricting 

As required, the New Jersey legislature redistricted its state legislative districts in advance of the 1991 election. Redistricting was considered to have favored Republicans, reflecting relative growth in the suburbs versus the state's Democratic urban cores.

Tax revolt 
A centerpiece of the Florio administration's legislative agenda was a $2.8 billion tax increase, which one consultant called "the largest single tax increase in the history of the finances of the 50 states" and "a national test case on both political and economic grounds." The increase also came amid a national economic recession. Very little public input was possible due to the package's short turnaround; the Florio administration cited restrictive deadlines. According to administration officials, the tax package was designed to aid blue-collar workers and the middle class, who it later admitted were "also the people most upset by enactment of the taxes." After the 1991 election, Florio aide Doug Berman admitted, "We were very full of ourselves."

Voter anger over the tax increase grew throughout the early months of 1990; many voters felt that Florio's projection during the 1989 campaign that new taxes were unlikely had amounted to a lie. In response to growing protest, the administration adopted a wait-and-see approach, maintaining the protests would peter out as the legislative package delivered benefits in the form of rebate checks, lower auto insurance rates, and increased funding for education.

In June 1990, New Jersey 101.5 talk radio callers Pat Ralston and John Budzash formed Hands Across New Jersey, a protest group which rallied thousands of supporters in Trenton on July 1 and collected over 350,000 petition signatures within the month. The group's stated mission was to obtain binding referendums and a recall mechanism; Democratic Assemblyman Thomas P. Foy declared his support for a recall provision on NJ101.5 soon after.

By fall 1990, Florio's approval rating sank to 18 percent; it would not exceed the low twenties for the duration of the 1991 campaign. The first political impact of the "tax revolt" was made manifest in November 1990, when incumbent Democratic Senator Bill Bradley was nearly unseated by Christine Todd Whitman. During her campaign, Whitman repeatedly asked Bradley for his position on the increase, but he demurred, calling it a state issue.

Republicans centered their 1991 campaign on opposition to the increase, as did even some incumbent Democrats, such as Senator Paul Contillo.

Gun control 
Another major legislative achievement of the Florio administration was a strict gun control measure targeted at "assault-style weapons." The bill's passage led the National Rifle Association to spend nearly $250,000 in the 1991 elections targeting candidates in both parties who had voted in favor of the bill and supporting those who pledged to repeal it.

Statewide polling generally showed that the bill was popular with New Jerseyans, so supporters were not directly attacked; rather, the N.R.A. spent heavily to advertise for or against candidates on other issues. Statewide, the N.R.A. donated directly to 78 legislative candidates, 75 of whom were Republicans, and 70 of whom won.

Education 
The Florio administration also received surprise opposition from the New Jersey Education Association, which had backed his election in 1989. After the passage of the Quality Education Act and strict new spending caps on local school boards, the NJEA endorsed a slate of legislative candidates which was almost exclusively Republican. The total slate included 46 Republicans and only three Democrats.

Aftermath and legacy 
The Republican landslide gave the party control of the New Jersey Senate for the first time since 1978 and they would maintain it for a decade until 2001, when a tied Senate result necessitated a power-sharing agreement with the Democrats. Two years later, Governor Florio narrowly lost re-election to Christine Todd Whitman.

Talk radio 
Prior to 1990, New Jersey 101.5 was known as an "obscure Trenton oldies station." During the tax revolt and the station's transition to talk radio, listenership quadrupled from 150,000 to 600,000. The John and Ken Show, from which the protest was launched, later moved to KFI in Los Angeles and became nationally syndicated in 1997.

1992 Senate presidency contest 
With Republican control of the Senate becoming likely during the campaign, Senator Donald DiFrancesco and Senate Minority Leader John H. Dorsey, neither of whom faced serious re-election challenges, engaged in a proxy contest to control the next Republican caucus and win the election for Senate President. Dorsey had already survived one attempt by DiFrancseco to unseat him as leader in December 1990, and DiFrancesco had previously served as minority leader himself from 1982 to 1984.

DiFrancseco had the support of moderates, led by former Governor Thomas Kean, and offered a less confrontational approach than Dorsey. Publicly, DiFrancesco said his efforts were focused on electing a Republican majority, but challenged the idea that as Senate Minority Leader, he was entitled to the presidency, saying, "It's not like I'm throwing Mr. Dorsey out of a position, because no one has it."

Each Senator spent at least $50,000 in other Senate races. Among incumbents, the struggle was projected as a dead heat, so special effort was made to influence incoming legislators. For instance, Dorsey spent $9,000 and DiFrancesco spent $7,000 supporting the campaign of Andrew R. Ciesla.

Ultimately, DiFrancesco prevailed. Dorsey remained in party leadership as Majority Leader but faced another intra-party challenge from future Governor Chris Christie in his district's primary. He successfully disqualified Christie from the ballot but lost the general election to Democrat Gordon MacInnes and left politics. 

DiFrancesco served as Senate President until 2002. After Christine Todd Whitman resigned to become Director of the Environmental Protection Agency, DiFrancesco succeeded her as the 51st Governor of New Jersey and oversaw the state's response to the September 11 attacks. He retired from politics after withdrawing from the 2001 gubernatorial election.

Incumbents not running for re-election

Democratic 
 Daniel Dalton (4th district)
 John F. Russo (10th district)
 Carmen A. Orechio (30th district) (redistricted to 36th)

Summary of results

Close races 
Seats where the margin of victory was under 10%:
  gain
  gain
 
  gain
 
 
  gain
  gain

District 1

Democratic primary

Republican primary

General election

District 2

Democratic primary

Republican primary

 Domenic Cappella, Ventnor City Administrator
 William Gormley, incumbent Senator since 1982 and candidate for Governor in 1989

During the primary, the National Rifle Association spent over $58,000, through various political action committees and alongside the Coalition of New Jersey Sportsmen, to defeat Gormley as retaliation for his support of the 1990 firearms restrictions. Gormley was the only Republican in the Senate to support the bill, but his vote was decisive in its passage. Another group, the Committee for Sensible Government, which received more than $40,000 from the NRA, financed at least six mailings denouncing Gormley for his past opposition to tax rebates. The PAC's chairman, Buena Vista Township committeeman William Fennen, expressed broader opposition to Gormley on the grounds that he was moderate.

Gormley said he initially planned not to campaign, having won his last primary with 73.5 percent of the vote and not having any opponent in the early stages of the campaign against him.

General election

 Dolores Cooper, Assemblywoman from Linwood (Independent)
 William Gormley, incumbent Senator since 1982 and candidate for Governor in 1989 (Republican)
 Meg Worthington, Galloway Township council member since 1986 (Democratic)

Gormley faced another difficult challenge in the general election, where the N.R.A. gave $20,000 directly to the independent campaign of Republican Assemblywoman Dolores G. Cooper. Cooper ultimately dropped out of the race, but Gormley spent $350,000 to preserve his chances at re-election. 

He prevailed by a much narrower margin than in 1987.

District 3

Democratic primary

Republican primary

General election

District 4

Democratic primary

Republican primary

General election

 John Matheussen, attorney (Republican)
 Anthony S. Marsella, Assemblyman (Democratic)

District 5

Democratic primary

Republican primary

General election

District 6

Democratic primary

Republican primary

General election

 John Adler, Cherry Hill councilman and candidate for U.S. House in 1990
 Lee Laskin, incumbent Senator since 1977

John Adler was recruited to run against Senator Lee Laskin by Camden Democratic boss George Norcross. Norcross decided to target Laskin after the Senator refused to secure an appointment for Norcorss's father to the New Jersey Racing Commission. Norcross also sought to secure Democratic control on the county board of freeholders.

In a surprise move, Democrats began spending heavily in this race late. Within the final week, the party purchased $250,000 in television advertisements for Adler on Philadelphia stations. Steve DeMicco, executive director of the New Jersey Democratic Committee, called the move a "sneak attack" which had been planned in advance in light of polling showing that Laskin was vulnerable. Up to that point in the race, the Republican Party had not given any assistance to Laskin, either because he was seen as safe for re-election or because of his reputation as a political maverick within the party. He voted against every state budget during his time in office.

On election night, Laskin conceded by calling Adler a "slimeball." Adler responded, "Win or lose, [Laskin] stoops lower than he should," a reference to Laskin's exact same insult against his opponent Maria Barnaby Greenwald four years earlier.

This would ultimately be the sole legislative seat gained by the Democrats in the 1991 elections; both Assembly incumbents in the district survived. Adler would go on to serve in the Senate until his 2008 election to the United States House of Representatives.

District 7

Democratic primary

Republican primary

General election

 Thomas P. Foy, incumbent Senator since 1990 (Democratic)
 Bradford S. Smith, Burlington County Freeholder and former mayor of Cinnaminson (Republican)
The campaign in the 7th district followed the standard attacks on the Democratic record. Republicans, led by Smith, harped on the incumbents' refusal to sign a no-tax increase pledge and called for a complete audit of state government, a repeal of the $2.8 billion increase, and a repeal of the Quality Education Act. At one point during the campaign, the Republican candidates delivered three rubber chickens to the incumbent legislators' offices.

Foy did respond, claiming he would have signed the no-tax pledge if it had a clause allowing him to use his "best judgment."

Even on Election Day, the race was presumed safe. In reaction to his defeat, Foy said, "The impossible has happened." Smith said he was confident of victory because of the "tremendous support we have had going door-to-door."

District 8

Democratic primary

Republican primary

General election

 Harvey Dinerman, Medford operation supervisor (Democratic)
 C. William Haines, farmer and incumbent Senator since 1985 (Republican)

As expected, the Republican incumbent C. William Haines was easily re-elected in the 8th district. Despite redistricting stretching the district into Atlantic and Camden counties, the district remained overwhelmingly Republican. No Democrat had won the area since Assemblyman John Sweeney in the post-Watergate 1973 Democratic landslide.

Dinerman ran on a platform of disrupting Republican hegemony in the district and blaming the state's financial mess on Republican former Governor Thomas Kean.

District 9

Democratic primary

Republican primary

General election

District 10

Democratic primary

Republican primary

General election

 Andrew R. Ciesla, Brick Township councilman (Republican)
 John Paul Doyle, incumbent Assemblyman from Brick Township (Democratic)

This race pitted two Brick Township residents against each other. Ciesla ran hard on the generic Republican opposition to the Florio tax increase and Doyle's votes, as an Assemblyman, in favor of the tax package. Doyle countered that Ciesla was indecisive and that the Democratic program had allowed municipal governments to cut local property taxes, but avoided directly mentioning the tax package or Governor Florio.

District 11

Democratic primary

Republican primary

General election

District 12

Democratic primary

Republican primary

General election

District 13

Democratic primary

Republican primary

General election

District 14

Democratic primary

Republican primary

General election

 Peter P. Garibaldi, former State Senator from Monroe Township (Independent)
 Peter Inverso, former Mercer County Freeholder (Republican)
 Francis J. McManimon, incumbent Senator since 1981 (Democratic)

This district was heavily redrawn following the 1990 census, replacing Franklin Township with Monroe Township and making it significantly more Republican. Nevertheless, the Florio administration argued that its blue-collar, conservative residents were those whom the tax package was most intended to help. 

The candidacy of former Republican Senator Peter Garibaldi, a Monroe resident and former mayor, also had the potential draw votes away from Inverso, who had never campaigned outside of Mercer County.

District 15

Democratic primary

 Richard N. Krajewski
 Gerald R. Stockman, incumbent Senator since 1982

Republican primary

General election

 Dick LaRossa, consultant and host of the televised New Jersey State Lottery drawing (Republican)
 Gerald R. Stockman, incumbent Senator since 1982 (Democratic)

This was the narrowest race of the year. The 15th district, based in Trenton, was heavily Democratic.

During the campaign, Stockman, who had sponsored the tax increase, defended it and referred to Republican proposals to repeal it as "snake oil." Stockman, the chair of the Senate County and Municipal Government Committee, had also sponsored a bill to reform tax assessment which critics said would create a mass exodus from larger cities, including Trenton.

LaRossa became the first Republican to represent Trenton since 1946, the year he was born.

District 16

Democratic primary

Republican primary

General election

District 17

Democratic primary

Republican primary

General election

 John A. Lynch Jr., incumbent Senator since 1982 and President of the New Jersey Senate (Democratic)
 Edward Tiller (Republican)

This was the narrowest Democratic victory of the campaign; Lynch was serving as Senate President at the time and was opposed by the New Jersey Education Association, the state's primary public school union, for his sponsorship of the Quality Education Act and proposal to cap teachers' salaries. In response to union opposition, Lynch accused the NJEA of "hiding behind" schoolchildren to justify salary increases.

In announcing an almost exclusively Republican slate of legislative endorsements, the NJEA singled Lynch out for defeat by asking teachers to contribute "Ten for Tiller"—$10 each to Tiller's campaign.

During the campaign, Lynch accused Tiller of lying about his military service in Korea. Other mailers accused Tiller of lying about his educational background, business experience, and qualifications for office. Tiller accused Lynch in turn of being under federal investigation and of numerous connections to organized crime. One independent mailer read, "John Lynch is CONNECTED to the UNDERWORLD."

Lynch later sued Tiller and the NJEA for defamation. The complaint was dismissed after appeal to the Supreme Court of New Jersey.

District 18

Democratic primary

 Thomas H. Paterniti, incumbent Senator since 1988 and Mayor of Edison
 Harry S. Pozycki, attorney and former Metuchen councilman

Incumbent Senator Thomas Paterniti was challenged by Harry Pozycki in a rematch of their 1987 contest, which Paterniti narrowly won.

This was the most closely watched primary in the state; party officials estimated that each candidate spent $150,000 before primary election day.

Republican primary

General election

 Harry S. Pozycki, former Metuchen councilman (Democratic)
 Jack Sinagra, mayor of East Brunswick (Republican)

Pozycki had an uphill campaign against the Florio tax package. Though he himself was not an incumbent, Pozycki's Assembly running mate George A. Spadoro had voted in favor of the package.

During the campaign, Sinagra proposed using turnpike funds to purchase NJ Transit.

District 19

Democratic primary

Republican primary

General election

 Randy Corman, Sayreville councilman and assistant counsel to the Senate Republicans
 Laurence S. Weiss, incumbent Senator since 1978

This blue-collar district had long been safely Democratic, but was put in play by the 1990 tax increase. Senator Weiss, the long-time chairman of the Senate Finance, Revenue and Appropriations committee, faced particular scrutiny as one of the initial authors and key supporters of the tax increase. He said, "I'm in a targeted district, but I'm not the target—I'm the bullseye."

Corman publicly noted the tax issue was the center of his campaign: "There are other planks in my platform... But right now, the voters are concerned with taxes and I think Larry Weiss is more vulnerable than most Democrats." One Corman ad depicted Weiss, Assembly incumbent Thomas J. Deverin, and Governor Florio with the caption, "For two years, Florio, Weiss and Deverin have been laughing all the way to the bank. On Nov. 5th, you can wipe the smile off their faces."

After his defeat, Weiss pushed for repeal of the tax package he had helped write.

District 20

Democratic primary

Republican primary

General election

District 21

Democratic primary

Republican primary

General election

District 22

Democratic primary

Republican primary

General election

District 23

Democratic primary

Republican primary

General election

District 24

Democratic primary

Republican primary

General election

District 25

Democratic primary

Republican primary

General election

 John H. Dorsey, incumbent Senator since 1978 and Senate Minority Leader (Republican)
 Adele Montgomery (Democratic)

District 26

Democratic primary

Republican primary

General election

District 27

Democratic primary

Republican primary

General election

District 28

Democratic primary

Republican primary

General election

District 29

Democratic primary

General election

District 30

Democratic primary

Republican primary

General election

District 31

Democratic primary

Republican primary

 Bret Schundler, Salomon Brothers investment banker
 Peter Varsalona, United States Marine Corps veteran

Bret Schundler, who served as New Jersey coordinator for Gary Hart's 1984 presidential campaign, switched his party registration to run as a Republican.

General election

District 32

Democratic primary

Republican primary

General election

District 33

Democratic primary

Republican primary

General election

District 34

Democratic primary

Republican primary

General election

 Joseph Bubba, incumbent Senator since 1982 (Republican)
 Joseph A. Mecca, Assemblyman from Totowa (Democratic)
 Newton E. Miller, mayor of Wayne and former Assemblyman (Unbossed, Unbiased, Unbought)

Joseph Bubba was seen as a rare vulnerable incumbent Republican, partly due to Mecca's name recognition in the district and the independent candidacy of Republican Wayne mayor Newton Miller.

District 35

Democratic primary

Republican primary

 Pat Kramer, former mayor of Paterson
 Walter W. Porter Jr., Passaic County freeholder

General election

 John Girgenti, incumbent Senator since 1990 (Democratic)
 Pat Kramer, former mayor of Paterson (Republican)

Because one of the district's two Assembly members, Frank Catania, was a Republican, this district was seen as potentially competitive before the primary. Girgenti had won a special district party convention in 1990 to fill the seat left vacant by Senator Frank X. Graves Jr.

District 36

Democratic primary

Republican primary

General election

District 37

Democratic primary

Republican primary

General election

 Todd Caliguire, former aide to Thomas Kean and W. Cary Edwards (Republican)
 Matthew Feldman, incumbent Senator since 1974 and former Senate President (Democratic)

District 38

Democratic primary

Republican primary

General election
Though all of the Bergen County districts were considered difficult to handicap due to redistricting, the 38th district was seen as among the closest, despite the fact that incumbent Paul Contillo voted against the Florio tax program.

District 39

Democratic primary

Republican primary

General election

District 40

Democratic primary

Republican primary

General election

References 

New Jersey State Senate elections
New Jersey State Senate
1991 New Jersey elections